John Hayward (died 1672) also known as John Haward, represented Dedham, Massachusetts in the Great and General Court in 1645. He served for nine years as a Selectman in Dedham. He was elected to office before he became a member of the First Church and Parish in Dedham.

Previously he lived in Watertown, Massachusetts. Hayward died in 1672 in Charlestown.

References

Works cited

1672 deaths
Year of birth missing
Dedham, Massachusetts selectmen
Signers of the Dedham Covenant
Members of the colonial Massachusetts General Court from Dedham
People from Watertown, Massachusetts
People from Charlestown, Boston